Dibromophenols form a group of aromatic chemical compounds which are both phenols and bromobenzenes. The structure consists of a benzene ring with an attached hydroxy group (-OH) and two bromine atoms (-Br) as substituents.  There are six structural isomers, each with the molecular formula C6H4Br2O, which differ by arrangement of the substituents.

References

Bromoarenes
Phenols